Rocco van Rooyen (born 23 December 1992) is a South African athlete specialising in the javelin throw. He competed at the 2015 World Championships in Beijing without qualifying for the final.

He competed in the men's javelin throw at the 2020 Summer Olympics.

His personal best in the event is 85.97 metres, set in Cape Town in 2021.

Competition record

Seasonal bests by year
2009 – 67.40
2010 – 74.13
2011 – 75.72
2012 – 71.36
2013 – 72.66
2014 – 80.10
2015 – 85.39
2016 – 78.48
2017 – 84.09
2018 – 75.20
2019 – 77.82
2020 – 85.80
2021 – 85.97
2022 – 77.34

Other appearances
Rocco van Rooyen was a contestant on Survivor South Africa: Island of Secrets, which premiered on 16 May 2019. Rocco was the seventh person voted out of the season.

References

South African male javelin throwers
Living people
1992 births
World Athletics Championships athletes for South Africa
Athletes (track and field) at the 2014 Commonwealth Games
Athletes (track and field) at the 2016 Summer Olympics
Olympic athletes of South Africa
South African Athletics Championships winners
Commonwealth Games competitors for South Africa
Athletes (track and field) at the 2020 Summer Olympics
People from Bellville, South Africa
Sportspeople from the Western Cape